The 2019–20 LigaPro was the 30th season of Portuguese football's second-tier league, and the sixth season under the current LigaPro title. A total of 18 teams competed in this division, including reserve sides from top-flight Primeira Liga teams. 

On 12 March 2020, the LPFP suspended the league until further notice due to the COVID-19 pandemic in Portugal. On 5 May, the LPFP announced the league would be abandoned, with Farense and Nacional being promoted to the Primeira Liga, while Casa Pia and Cova da Piedade would be relegated to the Campeonato de Portugal in 2020–21.
On 29 July, the Portuguese Football Federation announced that the 2019–20 Primeira Liga teams Vitória de Setúbal and Aves would be punished with direct relegation to the Campeonato de Portugal, after failing to provide valid licensing documentation to compete in the professional leagues. As a result, Cova da Piedade and Casa Pia were spared from relegation and allowed to compete in the 2020–21 LigaPro season.

Teams
A total of 18 teams contest the league, including 13 sides from the 2018–19 season, 3 teams relegated from the 2018–19 Primeira Liga and 2 promoted from the 2018–19 Campeonato de Portugal.

Team changes

Relegated from 2018–19 Primeira Liga
Chaves
Nacional
Feirense

Promoted from 2018–19 Campeonato de Portugal
Casa Pia
Vilafranquense

Promoted to 2019–20 Primeira Liga
Paços de Ferreira
Famalicão

Relegated to 2019–20 Campeonato de Portugal
Arouca
Braga B
Vitória de Guimarães B

Stadium and locations

Personnel and sponsors

Season summary

League table

Awards

Monthly awards

Annual awards
Annual awards were given on 28 August 2020.

Number of teams by district

References 

Liga Portugal 2 seasons
2
Portugal